Yoel Chehanovich (born July 26, 1993), is an Israeli footballer who plays as a forward for Shimshon Bnei Tayibe.

External links

1993 births
Living people
Israeli footballers
Hapoel Ironi Kiryat Shmona F.C. players
Hapoel F.C. Karmiel Safed players
Hapoel Afula F.C. players
Hapoel Ironi Baqa al-Gharbiyye F.C. players
Israeli Premier League players
Liga Leumit players
People from Katzrin
Association football forwards